Edward Leadbitter (18 June 1919 – 23 December 1996) was a British Labour politician. Leadbitter was a teacher, and served as a councillor on West Hartlepool Borough Council.

Member of Parliament
Leadbitter was Member of Parliament for the Hartlepools and then the renamed Hartlepool from 1964 until he retired in March 1992. His successor was Peter Mandelson. 

in 1979, Leadbitter played a role in publicly exposing Anthony Blunt as a spy for the Soviet Union. On Thursday 15 November 1979, Prime Minister Margaret Thatcher revealed Blunt's wartime role in the House of Commons of the United Kingdom in reply to written parliamentary questions put to her by Leadbitter and Dennis Skinner, MP for  Bolsover:
Mr. Leadbitter and Mr. Skinner: Asked the Prime Minister if she will make a statement on recent evidence concerning the actions of an individual, whose name has been supplied to her, in relation to the security of the United Kingdom.
The Prime Minister: "The name which the hon. Member for Hartlepool (Mr. Leadbitter) has given me is that of Sir Anthony Blunt."

Leadbitter was also known for his argument against the 1991 judgment of the Court of Appeal and House of Lords in R v R that criminalised marital rape for the first time. He claimed that married women would now falsely allege rape if a couple had a row.

Shortly before he quit Parliament, he angered Neil Kinnock by buying shares in British Telecom and British Gas.

He died on 23 December 1996, in the intensive care unit at North Tees Hospital, where he was being treated after a road accident.

References
Times Guide to the House of Commons, 1987

Notes

External links 
 

1919 births
1996 deaths
Politics of the Borough of Hartlepool
Labour Party (UK) MPs for English constituencies
Councillors in North East England
UK MPs 1964–1966
UK MPs 1966–1970
UK MPs 1970–1974
UK MPs 1974
UK MPs 1974–1979
UK MPs 1979–1983
UK MPs 1983–1987
UK MPs 1987–1992
Road incident deaths in England